Phaeoacremonium aleophilum is a fungus species in the genus Phaeoacremonium. It is associated with Phaeomoniella chlamydospora in esca in mature grapevines and decline in young vines (Petri disease), two types of grapevine trunk disease.

Togninia minima is the teleomorph (the sexual reproductive stage) of P. aleophilum.

References

External links 

 mycobank.org

Grapevine trunk diseases
Diaporthales
Fungi described in 1996